This is a list of written works by Bahram Beyzai.

Since 1960, Beyzai has authored over seventy books in Persian, including plays and screenplays as well as histories and research works and interviews and stories, some of which have been translated into other languages including English.

Plays

In English Translation 
 Aurash (tr. Soheil Parsa and Peter Farbridge)
 The Marionettes (tr. Gisèle Kapuscinski, M.R. Ghanoonparvar, John Green, Parvin Loloi, Glyn Pursglove)
 Evening in a Strange Land (1963) and The Story of the Hidden Moon (1963) (tr. Gisèle Kapuscinski)
 Four Boxes (tr. M.R. Ghanoonparvar)
 Death of Yazdgerd (tr. Manuchehr Anvar) / The Death of the King (tr. Soheil Parsa and Peter Farbridge)
 Memoirs of the Actor in a Supporting Role (tr. M.R. Ghanoonparvar)
 Kalat Claimed (tr. Manuchehr Anvar)
 The One Thousand and First Night (tr. Saeed Talajooy)

In French Translation

Screenplays

In English Translation 
 A New Prologue to the Shahnameh

Non-fiction

Books
 A Study on Iranian Theatre (1965)

Chapters
 "On the Situation of Theatre and Cinema"
 "Meskoob’s Reading of Iranian Mythology" in A Scholar for our Times: A Celebration of the Life and Work of Shahrokh Meskoob (2022)

References

External links
 

Bibliographies by writer
Bibliographies of Persian writers
Dramatist and playwright bibliographies
Bahram Beyzai

bibliography